Jean Catherine Pickering   (née Desforges; 4 July 1929 – 25 March 2013) was a female track and field athlete from Great Britain, who competed mainly in the 80 metres hurdles and long jump.

She won bronze medals at the Olympics and the Commonwealth Games and is the only British woman to have won gold medals at the European Athletics Championships in both a track and a field event (4×100 m relay in 1950, long jump in 1954). During her career she set British records in the women's pentathlon and the long jump.

She and her husband, Ron Pickering, had a lasting impact on British athletics, particularly through the Ron Pickering Memorial Fund, which provides support to young track and field athletes. Her son, Shaun Pickering, followed in his mother's footsteps and went on to become an Olympian and a Commonwealth Games medallist, competing in the shot put.

Athletics career
Born in Forest Gate, London, she made her international debut at the age of eighteen, competing in the 80 m hurdles. She represented Great Britain at the 1952 Summer Olympics held in Helsinki, Finland, where she finished fifth in the 80 m hurdles and won the 4×100 metres relay bronze medal with her teammates Sylvia Cheeseman, June Foulds and Heather Armitage.

In 1953, Jean Desforges broke a British record and became the first British woman to long jump over 20 feet, when jumping 6.10 m in Nienburg, Germany.

In the 1950 European Championships in Brussels, Desforges finished fifth in the 80 m hurdles and was part of the gold medal winning 4×100 m relay team. She was European Champion in the long jump, in the 1954 European Championships in Berne, Switzerland, with a leap of 6.04 m. At the same championships Desforges finished sixth in the 80 m hurdles. She remains the only British athlete to have won a European gold medal in both a track and a field event.

In the 1954 Commonwealth Games in Vancouver, Canada, Desforges won a bronze medal in both the long jump and 80 m hurdles.

Desforges was an eight-time AAA Championships winner, having won the 80 m hurdles four time (1949, 1952, 1953 and 1954), the long jump twice (1953 and 1954), and the pentathlon twice (1953 and 1954).

She ended her career with personal bests of 11.1 seconds for both the 100-yard dash and the 80 m hurdles. She also broke the British record for the pentathlon in her career, accumulating a total of 3997 points in 1953.

Family and foundation
She married Ron Pickering, a prominent athletics coach and television commentator, on 23 October 1954, in Forest Gate, London. The couple had two children, a daughter (Kim) in 1958, and a son (Shaun Pickering) in 1961 who went on to athletic success in his own right.

Her husband's death in 1991 led her to create the Ron Pickering Memorial Fund to help support athletics in Britain at a grass-roots level. By 2013, the Memorial Fund had given out £2.0 million in grants to young athletes, coaches and athletics groups. Such was the breadth of the fund's support, around 75% of the British track and field team had been Ron Picking Memorial Fund grant recipients earlier in their career, among them Olympic champions Mo Farah, Jessica Ennis, Christine Ohuruogu and Greg Rutherford.

She was appointed a Member of the Order of the British Empire (MBE) in the 2010 New Years Honours List for her services to athletics. She was inducted into the England Athletics Hall of Fame in 2011. Her passion for the sport remained until the end of her life – she suffered from bad health due to a heart condition in her last years but focused on being present for the Athletics at the 2012 London Olympics. She died aged 83 on 25 March 2013.

References

1929 births
2013 deaths
Athletes from London
People from Forest Gate
People from Broxbourne
English female sprinters
English female hurdlers
English female long jumpers
Olympic athletes of Great Britain
Olympic bronze medallists for Great Britain
Athletes (track and field) at the 1952 Summer Olympics
Commonwealth Games bronze medallists for England
Commonwealth Games medallists in athletics
Athletes (track and field) at the 1950 British Empire Games
Athletes (track and field) at the 1954 British Empire and Commonwealth Games
European Athletics Championships medalists
Members of the Order of the British Empire
Medalists at the 1952 Summer Olympics
Olympic bronze medalists in athletics (track and field)
Medallists at the 1954 British Empire and Commonwealth Games